Thomas Henry Coventry, Viscount Deerhurst (27 March 1721 – 20 May 1744) was a British Tory Member of Parliament.

Deerhurst was the eldest son of William Coventry, 5th Earl of Coventry, and his wife Elizabeth (née Allen), and was educated at Winchester and University College, Oxford. In 1742 he was elected to the House of Commons as one of two representatives for Bridport, a seat he held until his early death in May 1744, aged 23. He never married. His younger brother George succeeded him as Member of Parliament for Bridport and inherited the earldom in 1751.

See also
Earl of Coventry

References
Kidd, Charles, Williamson, David (editors). Debrett's Peerage and Baronetage (1990 edition). New York: St Martin's Press, 1990.

www.thepeerage.com

Deerhurst, Thomas Henry, Viscount
Deerhurst, Thomas Henry, Viscount
Alumni of University College, Oxford
Members of the Parliament of Great Britain for English constituencies
British MPs 1741–1747
Heirs apparent who never acceded
British courtesy viscounts